Truth in advertising may refer to:
False advertising
Truth in Advertising (organization), independent nonprofit American advertising watchdog organization
Truth in Advertising (EP), a 1997 EP by Negativland

See also
Truth (advertising), an anti-tobacco campaign in the United States
"Truth and Advertising", an episode of the US television series South Park